Florencio is a name which may refer to:

Given name
Florencio de Valeránica, 10th century Castilian monk, scribe and miniaturist
Florencio Abad (born 1954), Filipino lawyer and politician
Florêncio Carlos de Abreu e Silva (1839–1881), Brazilian lawyer, journalist, writer and politician
Florencio Flores Aguilar, Panamanian colonel, commander of the Panamanian Guardia Nacional in 1981
Florencio Amarilla (1935–2012), Paraguayan footballer and coach
Florencio Harmodio Arosemena (1872–1945), President of Panama from 1928 to 1931
Florencio Campomanes (1927–2010), Filipino political scientist and chess player and organizer
Florencio Molina Campos (1891–1959), Argentine illustrator and painter who also worked with Walt Disney
Florencio del Castillo (1778–1834), Costa Rican cleric and politician
Florencio Constantino (1869–1919), Spanish operatic tenor
Florencio Cornelia (born 1981), Dutch footballer 
Florencio Durán, Chilean politician,  President of the Senate of Chile from 1941 to 1944
Florencio García Goyena (1783–1855), Spanish jurist
Florencio Martínez (born 1986), Guatemalan footballer
Florencio Miraflores (born 1951), Filipino politician
Florencio Morales Ramos (1915–1989), Puerto Rican singer, trovador and composer
Florencio Olvera Ochoa (born 1933), Mexican Roman Catholic bishop
Florencio Randazzo (born 1964), Argentine politician
Florencio Sánchez (1875–1910), Uruguayan playwright, journalist and political figure
Florencio Varela (writer) (1808–1848), Argentine writer, poet, journalist and educator
Florencio Vargas (1931–2010), Filipino politician
Florencio Xatruch (1811–1893), Honduran general

Surname
Danny Florencio (born 1947), pioneer of the Philippine Basketball Association
Dinei Florencio, an electrical engineer
John Florencio, Filipino American pianist
Renato Dirnei Florêncio (born 1979), Brazilian footballer
Ricardo Soares Florêncio (born 1976), Brazilian retired footballer
Xavier Florencio (born 1979), Spanish professional road bicycle racer

See also
Florian (name)

Portuguese masculine given names
Portuguese-language surnames
Spanish masculine given names
Spanish-language surnames